Maciej Żurowski (17 September 1915 in Płock – 8 May 2003 in Warsaw) was a Polish historian of French literature, translator, Romanist.

Works 
Żurowski was an author of literature and researches about French literature, especially of 18th-20th century. He translated French and American literature, including works of Marcel Proust and Comte de Lautréamont.

References 
 
 

1915 births
2003 deaths
20th-century Polish historians
Polish male non-fiction writers
Polish translators
People from Masovian Voivodeship
20th-century translators